Henry Bankes (1757–1834) was an English politician and author.

Life
Bankes was the only surviving son of Henry Bankes and the great-grandson of Sir John Bankes, chief justice of the common pleas in the time of Charles I.

Bankes was educated at Westminster School and Trinity College, Cambridge, where he graduated B.A. in 1778, and M.A. in 1781. In 1776 he inherited his father's estate at Kingston Lacy.

After leaving Cambridge he sat for the close borough of Corfe Castle from 1780 to 1826; in the latter year he was elected for the county of Dorset, and re-elected in the general election in the same year, but was rejected after a severe contest in 1830. In politics he was a conservative; he gave a general support to Prime Minister Pitt, but preserved his independence. He took an active but not a leading part in nearly every debate of his time, and closely attended to all parliamentary duties.

The 1784 Enclosure Act allowed Henry to create the current Kingston Lacy estate and parkland footprint. He demolished the hamlet of Kingston which was situated adjacent to the 16th-century Keeper's Lodge, diverted the Blandford road (now the B3082) and converted former agricultural land to parkland. He undertook further minor alterations in the 1820s.

He was a trustee of the British Museum, and acted as its organ in parliament. In 1784 he married Frances, daughter of William Woodley, Governor of the Leeward Islands, and left a large family. His second son was William John Bankes, and his third George Bankes. His daughter married Edward Boscawen, 1st Earl of Falmouth. Bankes died at Tregothnan, Cornwall, 17 December 1834, and was buried at Wimborne Minster. William John Bankes succeeded him and took possession of Kingston Lacy.

Works
A Civil and Constitutional History of Rome, from the Foundation to the Age of Augustus, 2 vols. 1818.

References

Attribution

1757 births
1834 deaths
Henry
People educated at Westminster School, London
Alumni of Trinity College, Cambridge
English male writers
Tory MPs (pre-1834)
Members of the Parliament of Great Britain for English constituencies
British MPs 1780–1784
British MPs 1784–1790
British MPs 1790–1796
British MPs 1796–1800
Members of the Parliament of the United Kingdom for English constituencies
UK MPs 1801–1802
UK MPs 1802–1806
UK MPs 1806–1807
UK MPs 1807–1812
UK MPs 1812–1818
UK MPs 1818–1820
UK MPs 1820–1826
UK MPs 1826–1830